Porthill can refer to several places:

Port Hill in Oxfordshire
Porthill, Idaho
Porthill, Shropshire
Porthill, Staffordshire
Porthill-Rykerts Border Crossing, on the Canada–United States border
Porthill Bridge
Porthill Park
Porthilly

See also
Port Hills (disambiguation)